Charon is a genus of invertebrate animals belonging to the class Arachnida, in the family Charontidae.

Species
 Charon gervaisi Harvey & West, 1998 - Christmas Island
 Charon grayi (Gervais, 1842)
 Charon oenpelli Harvey & West, 1998- Northern Territory
 Charon trebax Karsch, 1879 - Queensland
 Charon annulipes Lauterer, 1895

References

 Biolib

Amblypygi
Arachnid genera